Pseudotolithus is a genus of croaker or bar, ray-finned fish in the family Sciaenidae.

Selected species
 Pseudotolithus elongatus - bobo croaker
 Pseudotolithus senegalensis - cassava croaker
 Pseudotolithus senegallus - law croaker
 Pseudotolithus typus - longneck croaker

Sciaenidae
Ray-finned fish genera